In shogi, Bear-in-the-hole Static Rook or Anaguma Static Rook (居飛車穴熊 ibisha anaguma) is a Static Rook opening that utilizes a Bear-in-the-hole castle. 

It is typically played against Ranging Rook opponents.

vs Fourth File Rook, ☖...S-44 variation

See also

 Static Rook
 Bear-in-the-hole castle

Bibliography

 
 
 
 
 『NHK将棋講座テキスト2011年4月号』 NHK出版 2011年
 先崎学 『ホントに勝てる穴熊』 河出書房新社 2003年
 遠山雄亮 『遠山流中飛車持久戦ガイド』 毎日コミュニケーションズ 2009年
 藤井猛 『現代に生きる大山振り飛車』 日本将棋連盟  2006年
 村田顕弘 『最新戦法マル秘定跡ファイル』 マイナビ 2012年
 村山慈明 『ゴキゲン中飛車の急所』 浅川書房 2011年
 渡辺明 『四間飛車破り（居飛車穴熊編）』 浅川書房 2005年
 渡辺明 『四間飛車破り（急戦編）』 浅川書房 2005年

External links

 Yet Another Shogi Site:
 Fourth File Rook: Sente Static Rook Anaguma: ▲P35 Rapid Attack Against △S54 Formation
 Fourth File Rook: Sente Static Rook Anaguma: Gote Fujii's System
 Gote Static Rook Anaguma Basics 

Shogi openings
Static Rook openings